fish is a Unix shell with a focus on interactivity and usability. Fish is designed to give the user features by default, rather than by configuration. Fish is considered an exotic shell since it does not rigorously adhere to POSIX shell standards, at the discretion of the maintainers.

Highlights
Fish has "search as you type" automatic suggestions based on history and current directory.
This is essentially like Bash's  history search, but because it is always on instead of being a separate mode, the user gets continuous feedback while writing the command line, and can select suggestions with the arrow keys, or as in Bash, press  for a tab completion instead. Tab-completion is feature-rich, expanding file paths (with wildcards and brace expansion), variables, and many command specific completions. Command-specific completions, including options with descriptions, can to some extent be generated from the commands' man pages.

Fish prefers features as commands rather than syntax. This makes features discoverable in terms of commands with options and help texts. Functions can also carry a human readable description. A special help command gives access to all the fish documentation in the user's web browser.

Syntax
The syntax resembles a POSIX compatible shell (such as Bash), but deviates in important ways where the creators believe the POSIX shell was badly designed.

# Variable assignment
#
# Set the variable 'foo' to the value 'bar'. 
# Fish doesn't use the = operator, which is inherently whitespace sensitive. 
# The 'set' command extends to work with arrays, scoping, etc.

> set foo bar
> echo $foo
bar
 
# Command substitution
#
# Assign the output of the command 'pwd' into the variable 'wd'. 
# Fish doesn't use backticks (``), which can't be nested and may be confused with single quotes (' '). 

> set wd (pwd)
> set wd $(pwd) # since version 3.4
> echo $wd
~

# Array variables. 'A' becomes an array with 5 values:
> set A 3 5 7 9 12
# Array slicing. 'B' becomes the first two elements of 'A':
> set B $A[1 2]
> echo $B
3 5
# You can index with other arrays and even command 
# substitution output:
> echo $A[(seq 3)]
3 5 7
# Erase the third and fifth elements of 'A'
> set --erase A[$B]
> echo $A
3 5 9

# for-loop, convert jpegs to pngs
> for i in *.jpg
      convert $i (basename $i .jpg).png
  end

# fish supports multi-line history and editing.
# Semicolons work like newlines:
> for i in *.jpg; convert $i (basename $i .jpg).png; end

# while-loop, read lines /etc/passwd and output the fifth 
# colon-separated field from the file. This should be
# the user description.
> while read line
      set arr (echo $line|tr : \n)
      echo $arr[5]
  end < /etc/passwd

# String replacement (replacing all i by I)
> string replace -a "i" "I" "Wikipedia"
WIkIpedIa

No implicit subshell 
Some language constructs, like pipelines, functions and loops, have been implemented using so called subshells in other shell languages. Subshells are child programs that run a few commands for the shell and then exit. This implementation detail typically has the side effect that any state changes made in the subshell, such as variable assignments, do not propagate to the main shell. Fish never forks off so-called subshells; all builtins are always fully functional.
# This will not work in many other shells, since the 'read' builtin
# will run in its own subshell. In Bash, the right side of the pipe
# can't have any side effects. In ksh, the below command works, but
# the left side can't have any side effects. In fish and zsh, both
# sides can have side effects.
> cat *.txt | read line

Variable assignment example 
This Bash example doesn't do what it seems: because the loop body is a subshell, the update to $found is not persistent.
found=''
cat /etc/fstab | while read dev mnt rest; do
  if test "$mnt" = "/"; then
    found="$dev"
  fi
done

Workaround:
found=''
while read dev mnt rest; do
  if test "$mnt" = "/"; then
    found="$dev"
  fi
done < /etc/fstab

Fish does not need a workaround:
set found ''
cat /etc/fstab | while read dev mnt rest
  if test "$mnt" = "/"
    set found $dev
  end
end

Universal variables
Fish has a feature known as universal variables, which allow a user to permanently assign a value to a variable across all the user's running fish shells. The variable value is remembered across logouts and reboots, and updates are immediately propagated to all running shells.
# This will make emacs the default text editor. The '--universal' (or '-U') tells fish to
# make this a universal variable.
> set --universal EDITOR emacs

# This command will make the current working directory part of the fish
# prompt turn blue on all running fish instances.
> set --universal fish_color_cwd blue

Other features
 Advanced tab completion.
 Syntax highlighting with extensive error checking.
 Support for the X clipboard.
 Smart terminal handling based on terminfo.
 Searchable command history.
 Web-based configuration.

Bash/fish translation table

See also

 Comparison of command shells

References

External links
 – containing documentation and downloads
fish on GitHub (active)
fish on Gitorious (obsolete)
fish on SourceForge (obsolete)
Fish-users – general discussion list for fish users
Shell Translation Dictionary - another Bash/Fish translation table

Free software programmed in C
Scripting languages
Unix shells